Danielle "Dani" Drews (born February 2, 1999) is an American professional volleyball player who plays as an outside hitter for the United States women's national volleyball team and Italian Series A1 professional team Cuneo.

Personal life

Drews is from Sandy, Utah and attended Brighton High School. She comes from an athletic family: her father, Paul Barton, played baseball and football at Utah from 1989-91. Her mother, Mikki Barton, played basketball and volleyball at Utah. Her brothers, Jackson and Cody, both play football in the NFL.

Drews married former Utah football player Christian Drews in 2018. She is a Mormon.

Career

College
Drews is left handed. She played indoor college volleyball for a total of five years, as she opted to use the extra year of eligibility granted by the NCAA due to the COVID-19 pandemic.

She finished her career as Utah’s All-Time Leader in career kills (2,268), sets played (561), matches played (150), and attempts (5,655). She is the only player in Utah history to record 2,000 kills and 1,000 digs. She finished her career ranked second all-time in the Pac-12 in career kills. She was invited to train with the U.S. collegiate national team in 2020 and 2021.

Drews also played beach volleyball at Utah and has participated in AVP tours. When she was in high school, she was intending to play collegiate beach volleyball for USC, but decided on Utah as she wanted to be close to her family. For Utah's beach team, she was named All-Pac-12 Second Team in 2017, 2018, and 2019.

Professional clubs

  KPS Chemik Police (2021–2022)
  Athletes Unlimited (2022)
  Cuneo (2022–)

Drews signed her first professional contract with Polish club KPS Chemik Police, however she left the team without informing them before the season ended due to the 2022 Russian invasion of Ukraine. The officials of the club informed Drews that remaining in Poland was safe, but on February 25, she didn’t appear at the briefing and training before the Polish Cup match. It was reported that the team will seek disciplinary punishment of Drews with the International Volleyball Federation (FIVB) and USA Volleyball. After returning to the U.S., she joined Athletes Unlimited in March 2022 and ended the season with 3,308 ranking points that included 222 kills, 119 digs, and 14 services aces, ranking third in total points out of 44 players. She was named to the Dream Team for the 2022 season. She signed with Italian Series A1 Team Cuneo for the 2022–2023 season.

USA National Team 

In May 2022, Drews made her national team debut when she was named to the 25-player wide roster for the 2022 FIVB Volleyball Nations League tournament, but did not see any playing time in the tournament.

In August 2022, Drews participated in the 2022 Women's Pan-American Volleyball Cup. Drews started for USA's opening match in a four set victory over Peru, recording 19 points on 15 kills, 2 blocks and 2 aces. Drews scored 24 points on 23 kills and one ace in a 3–2 loss to the Dominican Republic in a preliminary round match. The U.S. would eventually win the bronze medal after defeating tournament hosts Mexico in 4 sets.

In September 2022, Drews played in the Pan American Cup Final Six Tournament. In the opening match victory versus Mexico, she led all scorers with 15 points, recording 14 kills and 1 ace. In the semifinal match versus Puerto Rico, Drews again led the team with scoring, recording 21 total points on 15 kills, 5 blocks, and an ace. Drews recorded 7 total points in the gold medal match to Dominican Republic, U.S. lost the match, winning the silver medal for the tournament.

Awards and honors

Clubs

 2022 Athletes Unlimited – Best Outside Hitter

College

Four-time AVCA All-American (First Team – 2019, 2020, 2021; Second Team – 2018 )
Pac-12 Player of the Year (2020)

External links

Team USA Bio
CEV Champions League Profile

References

1999 births
Living people
Sportspeople from Utah
People from Sandy, Utah
Outside hitters
American women's volleyball players
American women's beach volleyball players
Utah Utes women's volleyball players
Utah Utes women's beach volleyball players
American expatriate sportspeople in Poland
American expatriate sportspeople in Italy
Expatriate volleyball players in Poland
Expatriate volleyball players in Italy
Serie A1 (women's volleyball) players
21st-century American women